The Bronstein-class frigates were United States Navy warships, originally laid down as ocean escorts (formerly called destroyer escorts), but were all redesignated as frigates on 30 June 1975 in the United States Navy 1975 ship reclassification and their hull designation changed from DE to FF.

A second and final ship, USS McCloy, was laid down in parallel with Bronstein.

This class comprised the second generation of post-World War II destroyer escorts. These ships can be considered developmental vessels as many new systems were installed to test for future use, such as a new hull design, larger bow-mounted AN/SQS-26AX sonar system, and ASW weaponry. This class was a new design from the keel up, incorporating the FRAM improvements, and was specifically designed to operate the DASH drone helicopter. The sonar was later upgraded to the AN/SQS-26AX(R).

The top weight of the new ASW equipment and the large bow-mounted sonar made the Bronstein frigates too slow to operate with the ASW task forces for which they had been designed. Thus the US Navy decided against any further procurement of ships of this class. The later s were given a larger power plant and greater speed.

Ships
Both were later sold to the Mexican Navy.

Bronstein
Built by: Avondale Shipyards, Avondale, Louisiana
Laid down: 16 May 1961
Launched: 31 March 1962
Commissioned: 15 June 1963
Reclassified: As frigate (FF) 30 June 1975
Operations: US Pacific Fleet
Decommissioned: 13 December 1990
Stricken: 13 December 1990
Sold: To Mexico, 1 October 1993; renamed Hermenegildo Galeana (E-42); later ARM Hermenegildo Galeana (F202)

McCloy
Built by: Avondale Shipyards, Avondale, Louisiana
Laid down: 1 September 1961
Launched: 9 June 1962
Commissioned: 21 October 1963
Reclassified: As frigate (FF) 30 June 1975
Operations: US Atlantic Fleet
Decommissioned: 14 December 1990
Stricken: 17 December 1990
Sold: To Mexico, 1 October 1993; renamed ARM Nicolas Bravo (E-40); later ARM Nicolas Bravo (F201)

At one time USS McCloy held the record for largest military drug bust at 49.5 tons of marijuana (late 1980s). A sea-going tug was forcefully boarded after an overnight chase while the tug's crew tossed bales of cocaine overboard and weapons fire was released the following morning at dawn. One of the tug's crew was wounded by .50 caliber gunfire and was helo'd off. A Coast Guard detachment estimated the amount and an attempt was made to tow the tug to port. The tug had too much damage and sank in the night after several attempts to salvage her.

McCloy made many drug busts late in her life, received several citations and was painted with marijuana leaves for each bust.

Other notables include involvement in the rescue of the crew of the submarine . One of the last US Navy diesel submarines, it had a battery compartment fire and was abandoned by her crew off the coast of Florida. McCloy ran lifeguard ops and eventually was designated the tow vessel to bring Bonefish to Charleston, South Carolina.

Notes

Sources
USS McCloy – navsource.org
Class history – Gyrodyne Helicopter Historical Foundation

External links

Bronstein-class frigates at Destroyer History Foundation
Bronstein info and photos
McCloy info and photos